Marriage in China has undergone change during the country's reform and opening period, especially as a result of new legal policies such as the New Marriage Law of 1950 and the Family planning policy in place from 1979 to 2015. The major transformation in the twentieth century is characterized by the change from traditional structures for Chinese marriage, such as arranged marriage, to one where the freedom to choose one’s partner is generally respected. However, both parental and cultural pressures are still placed on many individuals, especially women, to choose socially and economically advantageous marriage partners. While divorce remains rare in China, the 1.96 million couples applying for divorce in 2010 represented a rate 14% higher than the year before and doubled from ten years ago. Despite this rising divorce rate, marriage is still thought of as a natural part of the life course and as a responsibility of good citizenship in China.

Background 

Traditionally, marriage life was based on the principles of the Confucian ideology. This ideology formed a culture of marriage that strove for the “Chinese family idea, which was to have many generations under one roof". Confucianism grants order and hierarchy as well as the collective needs over those of the individual. It was the maintenance of filial piety that dictated a traditional behavior code between men and women in marriage and in the lifetime preparation for marriage. The segregation of females and the education of males were cultural practices that separated the two sexes, as men and women would occupy different spheres after marriage.

“Marriage was under the near-absolute control of family elders and was considered an important part of a family's strategy for success”. The system of patrilineal succession and ancestral worship left no place for daughters within their natal family trees. Traditionally, brides became a part of their husband’s family and essentially cut ties with their natal families with special emphasis placed on a wife’s ability to produce a male heir. As arranged marriages were customary, husband and wife often did not meet each other until the day of the wedding. Married life consisted of a complex and rigid family arrangement with the role of the male to provide for the family and that of the female to care of the domestic duties within the home, as dictated by the ideas conveyed in Song Ruozhao’s Analects for Women. Although Confucianism is no longer thought of an explicit belief system in China, it has created a lasting legacy of traditional assumptions and ideas about marriage. Thus, it is still a major barrier to achieving gender equality and women’s sexual autonomy in marriage. On the other hand, the higher house prices squeeze the marriage in China. The house price plays an important role on the influence of marriage and fertility. The increasing house price leads to the lower marriage rate and cause the other serious social problems in China. For the rapid reduction of marriage and fetility, the center government should establish the policy to deal with the high house price.

Although these are common Han practices, many minority groups in China practice different marriage and family lineage practices. For example, the small ethnic minority of the Mosuo practice matrilineal succession, and for the entire process from pregnancy, childbirth, to raising a family, the wife-husband pair work together and there is very little gendered division of labor in the practices of the Lahu people.

Marriage laws 

In general, while the following marriage laws were official policies of the state, they were not always followed in practice.

On September 10, 1980 the Marriage Law of the People’s Republic of China was adopted as the modified law code from the 1950 Marriage Law. The 1950 Marriage Law was the first legal document under the People's Republic of China to address marriage and family law. The 1980 Marriage Law followed the same format of the 1950 law, but it was amended in 2001 to introduce and synthesize a national code of family planning. This Marriage Law abolished the feudal marriage system, which included arranged marriage, male superiority, and the disregard for the interests of children. This law also guaranteed the right to divorce and the free-choice marriage.

The law was revised by a group that included the All-China Women’s Federation, the Supreme People’s Court, and the Supreme People’s Procuratorate, among others. The changes introduced in the 1980 Marriage Law represent the principle transition of the traditional structure of marriage to a modern legal framework. The law enforces provisions to value that gender equality and family relations are emphasized in the reform, and is divided into four major subsections: general principles, marriage contract, family relations, and divorce.

General principles of marriage 
The 1980 Marriage Law stipulates that marriage is based on the freedom to choose one’s partner, the practice of monogamy, and equality of the sexes.  Article 3 of the law emphasizes the freedom to choose one’s spouse by forbidding marriage decisions made by third parties and the use of money or gifts involved into the arrangement of a marriage. The law also prohibits maltreatment and desertion of family members.

The 1980 law also states that marriage must be a willing action where coercion by a third party is strictly not permitted. The age requirement for marriage is 22 years of age for men and 20 years of age for women, “late marriage and late childbirth should be encouraged.” This provision in the law shows a change from the 1950 law which set the age requirements at 18 and 20 for women and men respectively, showing state support of marriage at a later age.

The law bans marriage between close relatives, which is defined as lineal relatives, blood relative in the direct line of descent, and collateral relatives, such as cousins or uncles, to the third degree of relationship. Furthermore, after a marriage has been registered and a certificate for marriage is obtained, the newlyweds can freely choose to become a member of each other’s families if they so desire, meaning they are not obligated to choose one family and abandon the other as was tradition for Chinese women.

The 1980 law decriminalizes concubinage, which was strictly banned back in 1950; some lawyers believe that the sugar-baby activities or concubinage started to flourish again since early 1980s.

The 2001 Amendment of Marriage Law Article 3 bans the cohabitation between a married person with another opposite sex, again.

Family relations 
This section of the marriage law states that men and women are of equal status in the home and each have a right to use their own family name if they choose. Both also have the freedom to work, to engage in society, and to pursue an education where neither is allowed to restrict the other from pursuing these choices. The Law emphasizes marriage planning between the couple as well. Mistreatment of children, including infanticide or any serious harm to infants is prohibited. Property gained during a marriage belongs to both husband and wife and both have equal rights to such property. Familial relationships include the duty to support and assist each other; parents to provide for their children; and grown children have the obligation to care for their parents. This provision “[stresses] the obligation of children to care for aging parents.”  Women now are not required to be obedient to or to serve their in-laws anymore, and married couples are able to have more intimate relationships.

Children are given the freedom to choose either parent’s last name and have the right to demand the proper care from their parents. Children born out of wedlock have the same rights as children born to a married couple and the father has the duty to provide for that child. Adoption is legal and the same rights apply between adopted children and parents as with biological children.

Rights between adopted children and birth parents become null after the child has been adopted. Stepchildren should not be mistreated and have the right to the same relations between parents and children. Grandparents have the duty to care for grandchildren whose parents are deceased and grandchildren have the duty to care for grandparents whose children are deceased. Older siblings who are able to care for younger siblings that are orphaned have the duty to provide for their siblings.

Divorce 
Divorce can be granted when both husband and wife desire to get a divorce. Both should apply for a divorce and make arrangements for children and property so a divorce certificate can be issued. Divorces initiated by one party should be taken to the people’s court and will be granted when reconciliation is not possible. This law also specifies that divorce does not cut ties between parents and children and that those relationships should be maintained.

The 2020 Minfadian (civil code) introduced a 30-day "cool-off period" for uncontested divorces, which are handled by the Civil Affairs Bureau. This rule does not affect contested divorces handled by the court. However, the judicial system is known to habitually deny initial petitions. In one extreme case, Ning Shunhua v. Chen Dinghua, a Hunanese women took five petitions to divorce her gambling husband.

Marriage reform 

Marriage today has been influenced by many of the revolutionary and feminist movements that have occurred in the twentieth century. Such reforms focused on women and family. For example, the efforts to end foot binding, the movement to secure rights to education for women, and the campaigns to allow women into the work force, alongside other changes all challenged the traditional gender role of married women. However, in practice, women are still responsible for the majority of domestic work and are expected to put their husbands and families first. Working-class women are often forced to juggle the double burden of doing the majority of the household labor with the waged work they must do to support their families. In particular, the May Fourth movement called for men and women to interact freely in public, and to make marriage a free choice based on true love. This freedom of choosing one's spouse was codified in the 1950 Marriage Law, which also outlawed arranged and coerced marriages.

Important changes in marriage practices came from then newly established communist government which introduced new law in 1950 and 1980, include new Marriage Laws' outlawing of concubinage, child marriages, polygamy, and selling of sons and daughters into marriage or prostitution. Provisions made for changes in property ownership have also significantly altered the marital relationships between men and women. For example, women were allowed to own property under this law, as well as inherit it. Laws such as the one-child policy have influenced the family structures and fertility patterns of married couples as well.

The marriage laws also enforced an age restriction on marital union in an effort to encourage a later marrying age. The law however seemed to have the opposite effect as the law appeared to reduce the age at which couples got married. In 1978 the average age of marriage for women was 22.4 and 25.1 in rural and urban areas respectively, and after the 1980 Marriage Law it decreased to 21.0 years of age in the decade after the law was enacted. 
The mid twentieth century also saw changes in the occurrence of dowry and payments for brides as these no longer occurred as frequently. However, reports in recent years appear to indicate that these customs are still practiced in some areas, and may actually be increasing since the government has relaxed its tight prohibitions on the practices.

In January 2017, authorities in Kaili City, in the Guizhou province issued new rules banning wedding banquets for people who are marrying for the second time in an attempt to subdue public displays of extravagance. Multiple feasts, and the use of more than one location for one marriage have also been banned. A bride and groom must now register with their local government office if they wish to hold a wedding banquet to ensure that neither are registered as having been married before.

In December 2018 China’s ministry of civil affairs decreed at a conference on wedding reform that instead of an opulent event, weddings must "integrate core socialist values and excellent Chinese traditional culture into the construction of marriage and family", and "implement Xi Jinping’s important thoughts on socialism with Chinese characteristics in the new era, especially on the construction of marriage and family".

Same-sex marriage
Today there is no recognition of same-sex unions in China.  Same-sex relationships have been a part of China’s long history, but it is in the modern period where “cultural tolerance of same-sex eroticism began to fade.” In the modernization efforts after 1949 sexuality was removed from the movement until specific policies were enacted in 1956. Acts of homosexuality were outlawed and classified as “hooliganism” and punished under criminal law.

In 1984 the state no longer punished homosexuality as a crime, but classified homosexuality as a mental illness. However, homosexuality is no longer classified as a mental disorder. Being a homosexual person bears even greater stigma than being single or divorced. Despite this stigma, many local lala communities have developed within China that have increased the visibility of non-normative sexualities and genders. However, the heterosexual family and marriage still serve as public forms of social control that pressure many of these women to participate in heterosexual marriages. As a result, several mobile apps and social media networks have developed in recent years to help homosexual individuals find a member of the opposite sex to marry, while continuing to date people of the same sex.

Parental involvement 

The marriage decisions in pre-modern China traditionally were made by parents with the help of matchmakers, and the fate of the children were determined at an early age. Since the reforms in the twentieth century, and the implementation of the marriage law, such practices have been outlawed. Legally the decision to marry lies in the freedom of choice of a man or woman to choose their partners. Before the Mao Era, and during the period of late imperial China, young people had almost no choice about their own marriage. Parents or older generations decided everything for them, on who should be their mate and the amount of money spent on the wedding.

Arranged marriages 
Research has shown that the enforcement of the law has not necessarily been able to stop the practice of parents arranging marriages completely, but a change in the practice is evident. In the last fifty years, data indicates that parental involvement in marriage decisions has decreased in all areas of China and among the majority of the population.

Total control in the marriage decisions of children by parents is rare in China today, but parental involvement in decision making now takes on a different form. Parental involvement can range from introducing potential spouses to giving advice on marriage decisions. As the family is an important institution in Chinese culture, parents may no longer hold absolute control but continue to be influential in the decisions of their children’s marriages. Marriage decisions are important to parents because families are understood not simply in the present but as lineages existing throughout time in which living generations pay tribute to ancestors. Additionally, women are generally expected to marry men who are economically better off than themselves in a practice called hypergamy. Thus, marriage can be beneficial for the entire family.

Living with married children 
Outside of marriage decisions, parents may also be involved in the married lives of their children through their living arrangements. Although many couples now have their own separate residence, residential patterns of parents and children very according to different circumstances. The occurrence of parents and their married children living together changes over the course of their lifetime as circumstances like childcare needs for the married couples arise, or when parents become widowed, and/or consideration of the health of parents.

Types of marriage practices

Naked marriage

Naked marriage (luǒhūn) is recent Chinese slang, coined in 2008 to describe the growing number of marriages between partners who do not yet own any significant assets. The "Five Nos" involved are: no ring, no ceremony, no honeymoon, no home, and no car. The practice violates traditions that a groom should provide a new place for his future wife or, at least, that the couple's families should provide them a material foundation to provide for their future grandchildren. However, in order for the marriage to be legally recognized and protected by law and the government, the marriage must be registered with the government in accordance with the marriage law. The practice also saves the groom's family from an expensive wedding, the average cost of which has been reckoned to have increased 4000 times in the last 30 years.

Flash marriage
Flash or blitz marriage (Chinese: , shǎnhūn) is recent (and pejorative) Chinese slang for a marriage between partners who have known each other less than one month. In some cases, these young couples (usually in China's large cities) represent changing attitudes towards romantic love; in others, they have found the soaring prices of real estate have made such speedy marriages more economical. "Flash" marriages are also more likely to happen due to some couples being pressured by parents to marry quickly before the parents feel it is too late. However "flash" marriages are more likely to end in divorce soon afterwards as the couples find themselves unable to cope with each other due to personal habits that they did not know about before they married each other.

Shèngnǚ ("leftover women")

In recent years, the concept of Shèngnǚ or "leftover women" (剩女) has been created by the state media and government in order to pressure women into marrying earlier. State media often have articles about women regretting their decision not to marry early, highlighting the consequences of marrying at a later age. These “leftover women” are stigmatized as being abnormal and unfeminine, since remaining single represents a failure to adhere to the traditional role of women as wives despite their successes in the workplace.

Currently in China, there are more men than women, and women in every age group are more likely to marry than their male counterparts. Therefore, this will affect the long-term population growth in China as well as the number of working age population available in China, which is why the government believes that it is necessary to persuade women into marrying earlier.

Since the opening and reform period in the 1980s, increasing numbers of women hold college degrees and are now reluctant to be "tied down" to a married life so soon after their graduation, with women choosing to be more career oriented. Another dynamic is reverse hypergamy, where men preferably choose to marry women who are younger than them, earn comparably less than their counterpart and come from a "lesser" background compared to the man himself.

The media conception of "leftover women" has instilled new anxieties into parents, especially those of college-educated daughters who have delayed marriage past their twenties. Thus, many parents have been driven to search for potential matches for their children, and matchmaking corners have emerged in most of the large cities in China. Most of the matchmaking candidates in these corners are females, which perpetuates the idea that there are more suitable men than women with which to form marriage partnerships. These women feel the conflicting desires to satisfy their parents and to experience autonomic, romantic love. They also express the desire to change the gender norms of their social realities by combating the career women's "double-burden." Thus, although arranged-marriage is against official state policy, parents are still finding ways to exert influence and pressure on their children to form marriages that are beneficial for the family.

Cui Hun 
Cui Hun is a common phenomenon in China that parents and relatives pressure unmarried people and urge them to get married before they're 30, particularly females. In China, most parents hope their children can get married at an earlier age, around 30 years old or earlier. Usually, parents will introduce them to potential people to date when parents feel anxiety and worry about their children's unmarried status. One of the most popular ways is by asking their relatives and friends to find a proper marriage partner. Also, they will go to Matchmaking Corne and post marriage-seeking ads. The phenomenon connects to the ideology that females' marriage and relationship status undermine their success. Caring for the Next Generation Working Committee, a Communist Party-affiliated organization established by the State Council, surveyed in 2016 that 86% of people whose ages range from 25 to 35 experienced the pressure of getting married from their parents. Although the phenomenon of parental authority has weakened in recent years, many young people are still unable to defy their parents' wishes openly.

There is an unavoidable value gap between two generations when it comes to who and when they marry. Firstly, many older generations consider the ideal age to get married to be 23 for women and 25 for men. In particular, females are expected to marry before their late twenties, or they would be titled "Sheng Nu", in other words, "leftover women." However, as many young women pursue education and career, the average age of first marriage is delayed. For example, in 2005, people's average age of the first marriage is 24.37 for women and 26.68 for men in Shanghai. However, it becomes 28.14 for women and 30.11 for men in 2014. Therefore, parents get more agitated when young people pursue their education and career in their twenties without a partner in their late twenties. Secondly, members of the older generation consider marriage a necessary safeguard in sudden sickness or unexpected unemployment. In some respects, it conflicts with the younger generation, who value freedom and independence. Therefore, Cui Hun is a common phenomenon in China that many young people should deal with. However, parents urge their children to get married is not a completely outdated behaviour. When parents are getting old, they expect to rely on their children financially and mentally. They worry that unmarried children will not have a family support network as the relationship network plays a significant role in China.

See also
Chinese marriage
Ghost marriage (Chinese)
Walking marriage
Shim-pua marriage
Heqin
May Fourth Movement
New Marriage Law
Back-up partner
Sheng nu
Mosuo
Shanghai Lalas
Recognition of same-sex unions in China
Arranged Marriage

References

 
China